The M7 is a metropolitan route in the eThekwini Metropolitan Municipality, South Africa, connecting Pinetown to Brighton Beach in the Bluff.

Route 
The M7 begins at the M13 off-ramp intersection with the M19 in Pinetown and follows a route south as a dual-carriage highway named 'Solomon Mahlangu Drive' (previously Edwin Swales VC Drive).

Shortly after, it then meets the N3 highway (which connects to Pietermaritzburg) at an interchange and proceeds south-east as a dual-carriage highway. After the M34 Moseley Park off-ramp, the M7 leaves Pinetown and enters Queensburgh, winding through the town. It then turns eastwards at the Bellville Road off-ramp before ending as a dual-carriage highway east of Queensburgh at the intersection with the N2 highway (to KwaDukuza and Port Shepstone).

It continues eastwards as Solomon Mahlangu Drive but as a dual-carriage roadway and then south-eastwards through Carrington Heights, Sea View and Rossburgh. At Rossburgh, it meets the R102 at an interchange and co-signs with the R102 for less than a kilometre and immediately afterwards meets the M4 highway.

After the M4, it goes through Clairwood before intersecting with the M16. At the M16 intersection it turns left into Bluff Road and immediately turns right into Old Mission Road in a south-east direction again. It changes its name to Gray Inn Road in Wentworth before ending at the intersection with Marine Drive in Brighton Beach.

References 

Highways in South Africa
Metropolitan Routes in Durban